Navan O'Mahony's is a Gaelic Athletic Association club located in the town of Navan in County Meath, Ireland. The club competes in Meath competitions. With 20 Senior Football wins they are the most successful football club in Meath. The club has also won 2 Senior Hurling Championships placing them in the top 15 most successful hurling sides in the county.

History
The idea of forming a new Gaelic football club in Navan was first mooted during a late evening discussion at the house of the late Peter Hughes, Rathaldron, Navan, with co-founders, the late Eddie Duignan and Jack Callaghan spearheading the move. The house of the late Peter Hughes was a regular haunt for local neighbours. An impromptu meeting was called for the purpose of forming the new club but just nine men turned up for this meeting. They were; Peter Hughes, Jack Callaghan, Eddie Duignan, Paddy Cahill, Benny Gartland, Tom Duignan, Patsy Reilly, Terry O'Dea and Jackie Carroll.

Inaugural meeting on 28 October 1948
Not discouraged by these numbers and refusing to be daunted, these men called a second meeting for 28 October 1948. The venue was the local A.O.H. hall at the bottom of Watergate Street in Navan. This hall was subsequently demolished to make way for the present Navan ring road. 
There was a small attendance at this meeting but those present showed a desire to form a new Gaelic Football Club and the first officers elected at that meeting were: President James O'Rourke, Chairman Terry O'Dea, vice chairman Jack Callaghan, Secretary Jackie Carroll and Treasurer Thomas Deery.

Name of the club
It was agreed that the name of the club should be Navan O'Mahony's after the Navan Pierce Mahony's which was formed in September 1887 and derived its name from Pierce Charles de Lacy O'Mahony (1850–1930), M.P. for north Meath, a Parnellite and advocate of home rule. In choosing the name they were honouring a club which was one of the most successful in the county and also what Pierce O'Mahony stood for at the time – home rule. The Pierce O'Mahony's won the 1894 and 1895 Meath Senior Football Championship. In fact in 1895 Pierce Mahonys carried the banner for Meath and contested the All Ireland Final against Arravale Rovers from Tipperary, only to lose in controversial circumstances. Incidentally this was the first final to be played in what we know today as Croke Park. The first game ended in a draw and in the replay the referee reported Arravale as having won the match but later in a letter to the press he admitted having recorded the score incorrectly and that Pierce Mahony's should have been declared the winners. The press at the time were in full agreement with this statement but the ruling body of the G.A.A. could not see its way to alter the original report of the referee. A special set of medals was struck and presented to Meath as virtual winners of the championship. However the club subsequently disbanded as a result of the unfair treatment at the hands of the Central Council in 1897 and it was fifty-one years before the name O'Mahony's appeared among the clubs of Meath.

First team
The committee began to field their first team from the small number of players at their disposal. The club colours were to be blue and white – blue jersey with white collar and cuff. The hooped blue/white jerseys followed some years later. Club finances were naturally low and bicycles were used for transport to local games. Fortunately the fullback Eric Doyle was the owner of a lorry and this was used to convey players to away games. Dressing facilities or showers were unheard of at the time and players had to tog out along the nearest ditch to the playing area. Funds were raised by running concerts, card games, and membership contributions of 2/6d.

The team won the Meath Junior Football Championship in 1949 at the first attempt. The club went senior in 1950 but had little immediate success in the higher grade. They won the Feis Cup in 1951 with a victory over Skryne in the final at Páirc Tailteann. The Feis Cup final was played in conjunction with Feis na Mí. Irish dancing, singing story telling and Irish music formed part of the Feis which was organised by the Gaelic League. The "man in the cap" Peter McDermott came to live in Navan and joined O'Mahonys where he made a contribution to that victory.

First Keegan Cup winners
O'Mahonys were the first winners of the Keegan Cup in 1953, defeating Trim 3–7 to 2–4., with Tony McCormack accepting the cup for the first time. They won the 1956 Meath Intermediate Football Championship against Dunshaughlin and after a lapse of four years they regained the Keegan Cup in 1957 and went on to win the five times in a row from 1957 to 1961. They won it again in 2014 and 2015

Twenty Senior Football titles
Since its establishment in 1948 the club heads the roll of honour in Meath with 20 senior football championship titles.

Hurling
The club also has a hurling tradition and has won titles at all levels in under age competitions, completing seven in a row under 21 hurling titles in 2003 as well as back to back minor hurling titles in 1999/2000. They reached the final of the Meath Junior Hurling Championship in 1956 but were defeated by Boardsmill

Gold was struck in 1961 when they won the Intermediate Hurling Championship final against Salesian College, Warrenstown by 5–8 to 4–4. Intermediate successes were also recorded in 1970, 1979, 1993, 1997 and senior in 1985/86.

Camogie and Ladies' Football
The club also organises camogie and ladies football. In the Club's Golden Jubilee Year (1998) it was awarded the camogie club of the year award and young camogie player of the year.

Navan Omahonys have underage girls teams all the way up to senior.

On 8 September 2013, the determined intermediate team of 2013 defeated Summer hill in the intermediate championship in Ashbourne in wet and windy conditions. Final score was Omahonys 3–5 to Summerhill 1–7. The team was successfully captained by Aedin Murray.

Nursery for O'Mahonys
The Navan De La Salle Juvenile Hurling and Football Club which was originally based at the old De La Salle Brothers School, was the nursery for Navan O'Mahonys as the majority of their players progressed to O'Mahonys on reaching minor age to play a major role in many of their successes. The old De La Salle School which was a military barracks in the early days has since been demolished. The residence attached to the old school is still in situ and is off the Navan ring road and opposite the Navan Fire Station.

The De La Salle club had no grounds of its own and all training etc. was done in the old jumping enclosure, beside Páirc Tailteann. This is now the O'Mahony's grounds. Following the departure of the De La Salle Brothers from Navan due to the fall in vocations, it was agreed that the De la Salle and O'Mahony clubs should amalgamate. The departure of the Brothers from Navan was a tremendous blow to the club as the Brothers devoted much time to the promotion of hurling and football in club and school, especially Brothers Brendan, Finbar, Celestine, Anthony, Norbert, Cornelius and Francis. Many of them also played hurling and football with O'Mahonys. The amalgamation went ahead in 1989 and heralded a new era of unprecedented success at underage level with the winning of a record number of titles in subsequent years.

Contribution at intercounty level
The development of O'Mahonys as a force in hurling and football coincided with the rise of Meath in making an impact at intercounty level. Meath's first All Ireland winning team had included the Peter McDermott who also captained Meath to victory in the 1954 All Ireland Final. He is now one of the club's Hon. Presidents. 
 
Since then the club has been represented by footballers such as Joe Cassells, David Beggy, Finian Murtagh, Donal Smyth, Patsy Ratty, Willie McGuirk, John Brady, Séamus Clynch. In more recent times, the club has been represented by Niall & Shane McKeigue, Stephen and David Bray, Stephen McGabhann, Mark Ward, Kevin Reilly, Gary O’Brien and Cormac McGuinness.

Some O'Mahony hurlers have also represented Meath at inter-county level such as Ben Tansey, Gerry Kelly, Pádraic Coone, Niall and Shane McKeigue, Trevor Donoghue and Seamus Duignan.

Club development
The club draws its membership from the greater Navan area. A major part of the club's success is identified with the community links which have been forged over the years with families, business and community groups. The stunning success of St.Patrick's Classical School in its All Ireland Senior Football Colleges successes in 2000 and 2001 under Team Manager Colm O'Rourke highlights another dimension involving O'Mahony's players. The starting lineup at Croke Park in May 2001 against St. Jarlaths of Tuam contained nine O'Mahony's players with another five in the support panel.

Club grounds
The O'Mahony's were formerly owned by the Royal Meath Agricultural Society grounds on which the club house is situated at Brews Hill. They were later acquired by Meath County Board and subsequently purchased by O'Mahony's. Many local people still refer to these grounds as the "Jumping Enclosure" as they were used by the Agricultural Society for shows which included horse jumping and pony racing. The indoor show events took place in the "Pavilion" which occupied the site where the O'Mahony's club house now stands.

The grounds are in constant use by the club teams in hurling, football, camogie and ladies' football as well as by the local schools.
State of the art flood lights were installed in 2003 to facilitate the playing of hurling and football matches during the winter evenings. Mr Fintan Ginnity, Chairman, Meath County Committee, performed the official "switch on" and Seán Boylan, Meath Football Manager, refereed the first juvenile football game to be played there under lights. This first match was followed by an under age hurling match and ladies' football game. The pitch has also been redeveloped and lights installed at the lower training pitch.

The Navan O'Mahony's football grounds are slowly developing more. More facilities are currently under construction on the Trim Road on the outskirts of Navan. An extra two state of the art pitches are being developed in order to provide the huge community that has increased within the club. The new grounds also include a new clubhouse with dressing rooms. The existing grounds on Brews Hill in Navan was named Paddy O'Brien Park in summer 2015, named after the iconic figure in O'Mahony's who died in 2010.

Officers of Meath County Board
Many members of O'Mahony's have given sterling service while serving as officers on the Meath County Board. Liam Creavin a former secretary and treasurer served as board secretary from 1965 to 2000. Peter McDermott, 1954 All-Ireland winning captain also held the positions of Meath Delegate on Central Council and Leinster Council., deputy vice chairman, vice chairman and secretary of Meath County Board during the years between 1945–1955. Ned Giles, a former chairman of the club, served as Minor Football Secretary for many years.

Hurling
The club also has a hurling tradition. Currently the team plays at Senior and junior levels of the Meath Hurling Championship. The team beat Killyon in the 1985 final and in the 1986 final defeated Clann na nGael. The club has also won tournaments at Junior and intermediate level.

HonoursMeath Senior Football Championships: 19
 1953, 1957, 1958, 1959, 1960, 1961, 1963, 1973, 1979, 1981, 1985, 1987, 1988, 1989, 1990, 1997, 2008, 2012, 2014, 2015.Meath Senior Hurling Championships: 2
 1985, 1986Meath Intermediate Football Championship: 2
 1956, 2003
 Meath Intermediate Hurling Championship: 7
 1961, 1970, 1979, 1985, 1993, 1997, 2017
 Meath Junior Football Championship: 2 
 1949, 1974
 Meath Junior Hurling Championship''' 3
 1999, 2003, 2017

Famous players
A number of players from Navan O'Mahonys have represented Meath at inter-county level in both Hurling and Football. Including Peter McDermott who captained the 1954 Meath All-Ireland winning team. Other notable players include Joe Cassells, David Beggy, Finian Murtagh, Mick Downes, Donal Smyth, Cathal O'Bric, John Brady, Neville Dunne, Stephen Bray, Kevin Reilly, Gary O'Brien, Cormac McGuinness, Alan Forde, Marcus Brennan and Mark Ward.

References

1948 establishments in Ireland
Gaelic games clubs in County Meath
Omahoneys